Philipp Stüer (born 20 October 1976, in Münster) is a German rower.

Achievements 
 1997: 1st Place Eight (Nations Cup)
 1998: 8th Place Coxless Four (World Rowing Championships)
 1999: 7th Place Coxless Four (World Rowing Championships)
 2000: Reserve for the Olympic Games
 2001: 2nd Place Coxless Four (World Rowing Championships)
 2002: 1st Place Coxless Four (World Rowing Championships)
 2003: 3rd Place Coxless Four (World Rowing Championships)
 2004: 7th Place Coxless Four (Olympic Games)
 2006: 1st Place Eight (World Rowing Championships)
 2007: 2nd Place Eight (World Rowing Championships)

External links 
 
 
 
 Stüer, Philipp (2015), Gestaltung industrieller Dienstleistungen nach Lean-Prinzipien (Design of Industrial Services according to Lean Principles), Apprimus Verlag

1976 births
Living people
Sportspeople from Münster
Olympic rowers of Germany
Rowers at the 2004 Summer Olympics
World Rowing Championships medalists for Germany
German male rowers